Mindanao Express was an airline based at General Santos International Airport. Formed in 1996, the airline operated flights from General Santos, Philippines, to Manado, Indonesia, and Zamboanga City, Philippines, to Sandakan, Malaysia.

Fleet
The fleet in 1997 was:
 4 x Beech C99
 2 x Beech 1900C

References

Further reading
  

Defunct airlines of the Philippines
Companies based in General Santos
Transportation in Mindanao
Airlines established in 1996
Philippine companies established in 1996